Better a Widow is a 1968 Italian comedy film. It stars actor Gabriele Ferzetti.

Cast
 Virna Lisi: Rosa Minniti 
 Peter McEnery: Tom Proby 
 Gabriele Ferzetti: don Calogero Minniti 
 Jean Servais: Baron Misceni 
 Lando Buzzanca: Massito
 Agnès Spaak: prostitute
 Nino Terzo: Carmelo 
 Carla Calò: governante di Rosa  
 Roy Bosier: direttore d'orchestra 
 Bruno Lauzi: direttore d'albergo

Reception
"Werb." of Variety found the film to be a "modest imitation" of American styled romantic adventure films, noting "fine photography, sets, costuming and music" but that "screenplay is one of the major flaws but it is difficult to determine whether vet Italo writer Ennio De Concini and director Duccio Tessari are responsible or whether fault is with collaborators Brian Degas and Tudor Gates."

References

External links

1968 films
1960s Italian-language films
Films directed by Duccio Tessari
Films scored by Carlo Rustichelli
Italian comedy films
1968 comedy films
Universal Pictures films
1960s Italian films